Ethmolaimidae is a family of nematodes belonging to the order Chromadorida.

Genera:
 Ethmodora Khera, 1975
 Paraethmolaimus Jensen, 1994
 Trichethmolaimus Platt, 1982

References

Nematodes